Cry Panic is a 1974 American made-for-television mystery film directed by James Goldstone and starring John Forsythe, Earl Holliman, Ralph Meeker, Norman Alden, Claudia McNeil and Anne Francis. The film premiered as the ABC Movie of the Week on February 6, 1974 and was co-produced by Aaron Spelling and Leonard Goldberg.

Plot
A man accidentally runs over and kills a pedestrian outside a small town. He begins to suspect that the locals, including the sheriff, are keeping secrets about the victim.

Cast
 John Forsythe as Dennis Ryder
 Earl Holliman as Sheriff Ross Cabot
 Ralph Meeker as Chuck Braswell
 Norman Alden as Doc Potter
 Claudia McNeil as Ethel Hanson
 Anne Francis as Julie
 Eddie Firestone as Dozier
 Harry Basch as Jackson
 Gene Tyburn as Lipscombe
 Jason Wingreen as Woody
 Royce D. Applegate as Grady (as Royce Applegate)
 Wesley Lau as Joe Red 
 Jason Ledger as Stacey
 Pitt Herbert as Mailman

See also
 List of American films of 1974

References

External links
Cry Panic at BFI

1974 television films
1974 films
1970s mystery films
American mystery films
ABC Movie of the Week
Films directed by James Goldstone
Films produced by Aaron Spelling
Films scored by Ken Lauber
1970s American films